John Laird (born March 29, 1950), an American politician, is the California State Senator for District 17, since 7 December 2020, and was Secretary of the California Natural Resources Agency from 2011-2019 and a former legislator who represented the 27th district in the California State Assembly until 2008. The 27th district included parts of Santa Clara County, Santa Cruz County and Monterey County. Laird (along with Mark Leno) was one of the first two openly gay men to serve in the California legislature.  Laird became one of the United States' first openly gay mayors in 1983 when he took over the mayoralty of the city of Santa Cruz, California.

Early life
Laird was raised in Vallejo, California, and educated in Vallejo public schools. Laird's parents were both educators. He graduated from Adlai Stevenson College of the University of California, Santa Cruz in 1972 with an A.B. in Politics with general college honors, honors from the Board of Politics, and honors on an undergraduate thesis on the history of water development in California.

Laird served for two years on the district staff of United States Representative Jerome Waldie, and worked during the summer of 1974 for Rep. Bill Gunter of Florida in his run for the U.S. Senate. Laird moved to Santa Cruz, California and joined the staff of the Santa Cruz County Administrator in 1974 and later served in the personnel and social services departments.

City Council and Mayor
In 1981, Laird received the most votes in a field of eight to be elected to a seat on the Santa Cruz City Council. He was re-elected as top vote-getter in 1985, serving until term limits ended his Council service in 1990. He was elected by the City Council to one-year Mayor's terms in 1983–84 and 1987–88.  During his time on the Santa Cruz City Council, he worked with the environmental organization Save Our Shores to lead local governments in the fight against proposed offshore oil drilling and in favor of the designation of the Monterey Bay National Marine Sanctuary.

State Assembly
Laird ran unopposed in the 2002 Democratic primary and easily won election to the California Assembly.  Laird served as chair of both the Assembly Budget Committee and the Special Session Committee on Budget Process. He also served on the Judiciary Committee, the Labor and Employment Committee, and the Natural Resources Committee.

Before being elected to the assembly in 2002, Laird served as an elected member of the Cabrillo College Board of Trustees from 1994 to his election to the Assembly in 2002. He was re-elected to the assembly in 2004 and 2006 before being termed out in 2008. While serving the maximum three terms in the Assembly, Laird authored 82 bills that were signed into law.

His election campaigns have often won the backing of the Gay & Lesbian Victory Fund.

2010 State Senate Run 
Laird ran for the 15th District California State Senate seat previously held by Republican Abel Maldonado, whom Governor Arnold Schwarzenegger named as Lieutenant Governor in November 2009. He lost to Republican state Assemblyman Sam Blakeslee in a special election primary held on June 22, 2010 and subsequently in the runoff election held on August 17, 2010. Laird lost by a 7.59% margin in the primary and a 3.93% margin in the runoff.

California Resources Secretary 
Laird was appointed by Governor Edmund G. Brown, Jr. on January 5, 2011 as California's Secretary for Natural Resources. In the Brown administration, Laird oversaw a $10 billion budget and 25 statewide departments, commissions and conservancies, including the departments of water, state parks, fish and wildlife, and Cal Fire, as well as the California Coastal Commission, California Energy Commission, and California Coastal Conservancy.

2020 State Senate 

In January 2019, Laird announced his intention to run for the 17th District state Senate seat in 2020. He pledged to focus on a range of issues if elected, from managing the impact of climate change and wildfires, to protecting California’s ocean policies, supporting the middle class and expanding access to health care, education and affordable housing. Laird was elected on November 3, 2020 to the State Senate after defeating Vicki Nohrden by  64.7% to 35.3%.
In December 2021, the California Citizens Redistricting Commission voted in favor of a new state Assembly and Senate district maps. These maps took effect in January 2022.
California's 17th State Senate District spans the northern Central Coast, including the counties of Santa Cruz and San Luis Obispo and part of the counties of Monterey and Salinas Valley. Previously, District 17 included sections of Santa Clara.

During the first two years of Laird’s first term as a State Senator, he introduced a bill package tackling a number of the most pressing issues in central coast communities and around the state, including initiatives on wildfire mitigation, equitable access to healthcare services, tackling sea level rise, fixing a broken EDD system and issue of affordability as our state transitions to a greener, decarbonized economy. Laird moved 30 bills to Governor Newsom’s desk for signature, with 29 successfully signed into law.
<p>
Laird serves on 27 committees:
•	Chair of Senate Budget Subcommittee on Education•	Chair of the Senate Working Group on Climate Change•	Vice Chair, Joint Legislative Audit Committee
•	Member, Appropriations Committee•	Member, Budget & Fiscal Review Committee•	Member, Joint Legislative Committee on Budget•	Member, Judiciary Committee•	Member, Labor, Public Employment & Retirement•	Member, Natural Resources & Water Committee•	Member, Rules Committee•	Member, Joint Legislative Committee on Rules 
•	Member, State Allocation Board•	Member, Cradle to Career Governing Board•	Member, LGBTQ Caucus•	Member, Aviation Caucus•	Member Bay Area Caucus•	Member, Environmental Caucus•	Member, Mental Health Caucus•	Member, Outdoor Sporting Caucus•	Member, Rural Caucus•	Member, Tech & Innovation Caucus•	Member, Native American Caucus•	Member, Lake Tahoe Caucus•	Member, Select Committee on Pandemic Emergency Response•	Member, Select Committee on Student Success•	Member, Select Committee on Wine Industry•	Member, Select Committee on Non Profit Sector
<p>
On March 7, 2023 Laird announced his campaign for a second term.

Community activism
Laird has been active in the Santa Cruz community, serving as Vice Chair of the City Charter Review Committee, a founder of the Santa Cruz Community Credit Union, and a board member of the Santa Cruz Area Chamber of Commerce. He has been active on a variety of community boards.

He has been active with the lesbian and gay community, as a columnist for the Lavender Reader, a commentator on KZSC's "Closet Free Radio", a founding member of the International Network of Gay and Lesbian Officials—and was an original board member of BAYMEC, the gay and lesbian political action committee for San Mateo, Santa Clara, Monterey and Santa Cruz Counties. In the Assembly, he served as chair of the California Legislative LGBT Caucus.

Laird was a founding member of the Santa Cruz AIDS Project. He served as executive director of the Santa Cruz AIDS Project from 1991 to 1994.

He also has served on the Santa Cruz Community Foundation's Advisory Committee for the Lesbian and Gay Grants Partnership. Laird lives in Santa Cruz with his spouse John Flores. He is fluent in Spanish.

Footnotes

External links
The Living Room Biographies
Native Son: Good Times talks with Assemblymember John Laird about how he's tackling the big issues in Sacramento.
Official Senate Campaign Site

State cabinet secretaries of California
1950 births
Living people
California Natural Resources Agency
Gay politicians
LGBT people from California
LGBT state legislators in California
LGBT mayors of places in the United States
Mayors of Santa Cruz, California
Democratic Party members of the California State Assembly
Democratic Party California state senators
University of California, Santa Cruz alumni
20th-century American politicians
21st-century American politicians
Politicians from Vallejo, California
Appropriations Committee member, California State Senate